David Huxley may refer to:

David Bruce Huxley (1915–1992), financier and lawyer
David Huxley, Australian ice hockey player, captain of Adelaide Adrenaline
David Huxley, Cary Grant's character in the 1938 film Bringing Up Baby
David Huxley, a character in 8mm 2

See also 
 Huxley (surname)